Kebon Jeruk (Indonesian for "orange garden") is a subdistrict (kecamatan) of West Jakarta, Indonesia. Kebon Jeruk is roughly bounded by Kali Pesanggrahan creek to the west, Kebayoran Lama Road to the south, Daan Mogot Road to the north, and Rawa Belong - Batu Sari Road to the east. The area is approximately 18 square km.

The Jakarta–Tangerang Toll Road passes through the subdistrict, connecting Jakarta to Merak in Banten Province. 
The major streets in Kebon Jeruk are Panjang Road, Arjuna Utara (North Arjuna) and Arjuna Selatan (South Arjuna) Roads, and Perjuangan Road.

Kelurahan (administrative villages) 
The subdistrict of Kebon Jeruk is divided into seven kelurahan or administrative villages:
Duri Kepa - area code 11510
Kedoya Selatan - area code 11520
Kedoya Utara - area code 11520
Kebon Jeruk - area code 11530
Sukabumi Utara - area code 11540
Kelapa Dua - area code 11550
Sukabumi Selatan - area code 11560

List of important places 
RCTI headquarters
MNCTV headquarters
GTV headquarters
Metro TV headquarters
Maria Bunda Karmel Church
Grha Kedoya Hospital
Siloam Hospital
Jakarta Eye Center (JEC)
Bina Nusantara University
SMAN 16 Jakarta Barat
Museum Macan

Districts of Jakarta
West Jakarta